Krasnodar is a Russian Air Force airbase located northwest of Krasnodar, Krasnodar Krai, Russia.

The base is home to the 275th Aviation Repair Plant, and formerly home to the 802nd Training Aviation Regiment between 1952 and 1993 which flew the Sukhoi Su-25 (ASCC: Frogfoot) and the Aero L-39 Albatros.

References

Russian Air Force bases